Australella may refer to:
 Australella, a genus of springtails in the family Brachystomellidae, synonym of Brachystomellides
 Australella, a genus of bryozoans in the family Plumatellidae, synonym of Hyalinella